Lamoria attamasca is a species of snout moth in the genus Lamoria. It was described by Whalley in 1964, and is known from South Africa.

References

Endemic moths of South Africa
Moths described in 1964
Tirathabini